My Woman, My Woman, My Wife is a studio album by country music singer Marty Robbins. It was released in 1970 by Columbia Records.

The album debuted on Billboard magazine's country album chart on May 30, 1970, peaked at No. 2, and remained on the chart for a total of 22 weeks. The album included the No. 1 hit single, "My Woman, My Woman, My Wife".

Track listing
Side A
 "My Woman, My Woman, My Wife"
 "Can't Help Falling in Love"
 "Love Me Tender"
 "I've Got a Woman's Love"
 "Three Little Words"
 "Maria (If I Could)"

Side B
 "The Master's Touch"
 "My Happy Heart Sings"
 "Without You to Love"
 "A Very Special Way"
 "Martha Ellen Jenkins"

Charts

Weekly charts

Year-end charts

References

1970 albums
Marty Robbins albums
Columbia Records albums